WRKJ is a Christian radio station licensed to Westbrook, Maine, broadcasting on 88.5 MHz FM. WRKJ is owned by Word Radio Educational Foundation. The station is also simulcast on 91.7 WWPC in New Durham, New Hampshire.

References

External links
WRKJ's website

RKJ
Westbrook, Maine
RKJ
Radio stations established in 2011